This is a list of all the United States Supreme Court cases from volume 348 of the United States Reports:

External links

1954 in United States case law
1955 in United States case law